
Year 51 BC was a year of the pre-Julian Roman calendar. At the time, it was known as the Year of the Consulship of Marcellus and Sulpicius (or, less frequently, year 703 Ab urbe condita). The denomination 51 BC for this year has been used since the early medieval period, when the Anno Domini calendar era became the prevalent method in Europe for naming years.

Events 
 By place 

 Roman Republic 
 Consuls: Marcus Claudius Marcellus and Servius Sulpicius Rufus.
 Pompey demands that Julius Caesar lay down his command before he can stand for consul.

 Egypt 
 Spring – King Ptolemy XII (Auletes) dies and is succeeded by his eldest surviving daughter Cleopatra VII and her younger brother Ptolemy XIII as co-rulers of the Ptolemaic Kingdom.

 Asia 
 The Xiongnu split into two hordes. The Eastern horde is subject to China.

Births 
 Cheng, Chinese emperor of the Han Dynasty (d. 7 BC)
 Publius Sulpicius Quirinius, Roman aristocrat (d. 21 AD)

Deaths 
 Ariobarzanes II (Philopator), king of Cappadocia 
 Julia Minor, sister of Julius Caesar (b. 100 BC)
 Marcus Atius Balbus, Roman praetor and governor (b. 105 BC)
 Posidonius, Greek philosopher, astronomer and geographer
 Ptolemy XII (Auletes), king (pharaoh) of the Ptolemaic Kingdom

References